Terror Squad: The Album is the debut recording studio album by Terror Squad. The group's line up at recording was Big Pun, Armageddon, Triple Seis, Prospect, Fat Joe and Cuban Link. Production was contributed by JuJu, The Infinite Arkatechz, Buckwild, and Armageddon as well as The Alchemist. The album is the only Terror Squad release to feature Big Pun before his death five months later. The LP has sold over 250,000 copies to date.

Track listing

References

1999 debut albums
Terror Squad (group) albums
Atlantic Records albums
Albums produced by the Alchemist (musician)
Albums produced by the Beatnuts
Albums produced by the Infinite Arkatechz
Albums produced by Buckwild